Portarlington station is a railway station on the Dublin-Cork Main Line.

It is the branching-off/exchange point for services to Galway, Ballina, and Westport.
The Galway/Mayo line diverges at the west end of the station via a single lead junction towards Athlone.

The station is situated just outside Portarlington, County Laois, Ireland.

The station formerly had a third track between the platforms "the centre or middle road" which was removed in 2005 when the platforms were lengthened and widened in preparation for the introduction of Mk 4 Inter City trains.

History
The station opened on 26 June 1847.

See also
 List of railway stations in Ireland

References

External links

Irish Rail Portarlington Station website

Iarnród Éireann stations in County Laois
Railway stations in County Laois
Railway stations opened in 1847
Portarlington, County Laois
1847 establishments in Ireland
Railway stations in the Republic of Ireland opened in 1847